Nicoleta Balog (née Safta; born 17 November 1994, in Râmnicu Vâlcea) is a Romanian handballer who plays for Dunărea Brăila. 

In 2012, she participated at the 2012 Women's Junior World Handball Championship in the Czech Republic and the 2012 Women's Youth World Handball Championship in Montenegro.

International honours 
EHF Champions League:
Semifinalist: 2012, 2013

References 

1994 births
Living people
Sportspeople from Râmnicu Vâlcea
Romanian female handball players 
SCM Râmnicu Vâlcea (handball) players